Igbo literature is the spoken and written literature of the Igbo people. Before the advents of writing, Igbos practiced oral literature, folk songs and poetry.

Writing 

Although there are records that Igbo literature began as far as 1857, this was a 17 pages primer which was written by Samuel Ajayi Crowther. From 1872 to 1913, several religious books were written and translated in some dialects of Igbo, particularly Onicha and Isuama dialects. In 1924, Israel E. Iwekanuno published a 262-page history book titled Akuko Ala Obosi which narrated the history of Obosi town.

The first Igbo novel Omenuko was written by Pita Nwana in 1932 and published in 1933 by Longman, Green and Co. Pita Nwana's Omenuko was regarded as the bedrock for fiction in Igbo literature. It was subsequently followed by Ije Odumodu Jere by Henry Leopold Bell-Gam which was published in 1966 also by Longman. Other early writers of Igbo fiction include Tony Ubesie, F. C. Ogbalu, Ude Odilora, Julie N. Onwuchekwa and Mmuotulummanya J. Okafo.

References 

Igbo culture
Arts in Igboland